Thomas John Clapperton FRBS (14 October 1879 – 15 February 1962) was a Scottish sculptor, famous for the statue of Robert the Bruce at the entrance of Edinburgh Castle erected in 1929.

Biography
Clapperton was born on 14 October 1879 in Galashiels in the Scottish Borders, the son of the photographer John William Clapperton. He studied at the Galashiels Mechanics Institute, then Glasgow School of Art from 1899 to 1901, then the Kennington School of Art in London and then the Royal Academy Schools in 1904 and 1905. In the latter he was student assistant to Sir Goscombe John. After further studies in Paris and Rome, he set up studios at Chelsea and St John's Wood, London, as a sculptor.

Although commissioned to design a monument to Mungo Park in Selkirk this was ultimately executed by the more experienced Andrew Currie. In the First World War he served in India. Clapperton's monuments are often of individual figures, rather than the large group war memorials of Goscombe John, under whom Clapperton had studied at the Royal Academy. In collaboration with C. L. J. Doman, he produced in 1926 the large frieze representing Britannia with the Wealth of East and West on the front of Liberty's department store in Regent Street, London. His work overseas includes a war memorial in New Zealand, a sculpture in Canada and a fountain in California.

In 1926, a bronze sculpture by Clapperton was commissioned by the mayor of Oamaru, Robert Milligan, for the Oamaru Botanic Gardens and was unveiled on 7 March 1927. Milligan was inspired by Sir George Frampton's 1913 Peter Pan statue in London's Kensington Gardens and wanted a similar sculpture for Oamaru. Milligan was referred to Clapperton since he had been a pupil of Frampton's. The sculpture is entitled 'Wonderland Statue' and was gifted by the mayor to his city. The work appears more ornate and intricate than the Peter Pan statue. It is reported that Harold Richmond so loved Clapperton's Wonderland Statue in the Oamaru Gardens as a child, that later as an adult he gifted two statues (sculpted by Cecil Thomas) to the Dunedin Botanic Garden. One statue is of Peter Pan, and the other is of Wendy and her brothers.

Clapperton was elected a Fellow of the Royal British Society of Sculptors in 1938. He died in Upper Beeding in Sussex on 15 February 1962.

Public works

References

External links

 

1879 births
1962 deaths
20th-century Scottish male artists
20th-century Scottish sculptors
Alumni of the Glasgow School of Art
Alumni of the Royal Academy Schools
Fellows of the Royal British Society of Sculptors
People from Galashiels
People from Upper Beeding
Scottish male sculptors